Walkossam is a village in the commune of Tignère, in the Adamawa Region of Cameroon.

Population 
In 1967,  Walkossam contained 70 inhabitants, mainly Kutin.

At the time of the 2005 census, there were 885 people in the village.

References

Bibliography 
 Jean Boutrais (ed.), Peuples et cultures de l'Adamaoua (Cameroun) : actes du colloque de Ngaoundéré, du 14 au 16 janvier 1992, ORSTOM, Paris ; Ngaoundéré-Anthropos, 1993, 316 p. 
 Dictionnaire des villages de l'Adamaoua, ONAREST, Yaoundé, October 1974, 133 p.

External links 
 Tignère, on the website Communes et villes unies du Cameroun (CVUC)

Populated places in Adamawa Region